The Only Woman is a 1924 American silent drama film produced by Joseph M. Schenck for Norma Talmadge Productions and distributed by First National. It was directed by Sidney Olcott with Norma Talmadge as the leading woman.

Plot
As described in a review in a film magazine, Fighting Jerry Herrington (Davis), a financial power, gets proof that William Brinsley (Hall) has speculated with trust funds and threatens to put him in jail unless Brinsley agrees to the marriage of his daughter Helen (Talmadge) to Herrington’s son Rex (O'Brien), who is a drunkard. Herrington believes Helen is the only woman who can reform his son. Helen finally agrees and fulfills her contract to the letter. Herrington finally tells her that, when Rex returns to him sober and with a purpose, he will arrange a divorce. Helen starts to try and make a man of him. She takes him on a cruise and keeps liquor away from him. A storm comes up, there is a collision, all are lost but Helen, Rex, and Ole Hanson (Betz), a sailor who becomes officious. Ole later falls overboard in a fight with Rex. Finally they are rescued and return home. Rex offers to give Helen a divorce, but she tells him that she does not want one.

Cast

Reception
Mordaunt Hall of The New York Times wrote, "Although the actual plot of Norma Talmadge's latest film vehicle. The Only Woman, is not unfamiliar, the story contains several interesting situations which are effectively pictured."

Preservation status
A print of The Only Woman with some decomposition survives in the Library of Congress, Packard Campus for Audio-Visual Conservation collection.

References

External links

Still with director Olcott at silenthollywood.com
 The Only Woman at website dedicated to Sidney Olcott

1924 films
American silent feature films
Films directed by Sidney Olcott
First National Pictures films
American black-and-white films
1924 drama films
1920s American films